Studio der frühen Musik was an early music group active from 1960–1980 and based in Munich.

The leader of the group was Thomas Binkley, and the activity of the group coincided with the years he was teaching at the Schola Cantorum Basiliensis. Core members of the group were Binkley (lute), Sterling Jones (vielle), and Andrea von Ramm (mezzo-soprano, rebec, hurdy-gurdy and harp), who had previously organised an earlier Studio der Frühen Musik in Cologne. To these three members were added a male singer; first the tenors Nigel Rogers 1960-1964, then Willard Cobb 1964-1970, and Richard Levitt (counter-tenor) 1970-1979. The activity of the group ceased when Binkley returned to America to found the Early Music Institute at Bloomington, Indiana in 1979.

An important predecessor was New York Pro Musica, founded 1952 by Noah Greenberg (1919-1966). But Studio der frühen Musik produced a "radically different sound" anticipated other ensembles such as the Early Music Consort of London of David Munrow and Christopher Hogwood (founded 1967, disbanded in 1976 following Munrow's death), and the Clemencic Consort founded in 1969 by recorder player René Clemencic. The end of Studio der frühen Musik's activity coincided with the watershed in medieval performance moving to a cappella performance typified by Gothic Voices founded by Christopher Page in 1980.

References

External links
 Discography at EMFAQ
 Andrea von Ramm at Bach Cantatas Website

Early music groups
Musical groups established in 1960
1960 establishments in West Germany